Juha Peltola (born 12 January 1975) is a Finnish orienteering competitor and World Champion. He participated on the Finnish winning team in the 2001 World Orienteering Championships. He also has a silver medal from the 1999 Short Distance, and silver medals from the 1997 and 1999 Team Events.

See also
 Finnish orienteers
 List of orienteers
 List of orienteering events

References

External links

1975 births
Living people
Finnish orienteers
Male orienteers
Foot orienteers
World Orienteering Championships medalists
Competitors at the 2001 World Games